Mabille is a surname. Notable people with the surname include:
 Alexis Mabille (born 1977), French fashion designer
 Jules François Mabille (1831−1904), French malacologist, biologist and zoologist
 Jules Paul Mabille (1835–1923), French entomologist
 Xavier Mabille (1933–2012), Belgian historian and political scientist

French-language surnames